The Drifter is a 1929 American silent Western film directed by Robert De Lacey and starring Tom Mix, Dorothy Dwan and Barney Furey. It was one of the final films produced by FBO before the company was absorbed into the larger RKO Pictures.

Cast
 Tom Mix as Tom McCall  
 Dorothy Dwan as Ruth Martin  
 Barney Furey as Happy Hogan  
 Albert J. Smith as Pete Lawson 
 Ernest Wilson as Uncle Abe  
 Frank Austin as Seth Martin  
 Joe Rickson as Hank  
 Wynn Mace as Henchman

References

Bibliography 
 Jensen, Richard D. The Amazing Tom Mix: The Most Famous Cowboy of the Movies. 2005.

External links 
 

1929 Western (genre) films
Films directed by Robert De Lacey
1929 films
American black-and-white films
Film Booking Offices of America films
Silent American Western (genre) films
1920s English-language films
1920s American films